St. Praulius (Pravlios, Praylius) was a bishop of Jerusalem from 417 to 422.  He succeeded John II.  According to Theodoret, Praulius' disposition and bearing suited the bishop's name, which is derived from the Greek word for "meek-spirited."

He is venerated as a saint in the Eastern Orthodox Church on August 27.

References 

5th-century bishops of Jerusalem
Saints from the Holy Land
Eastern Orthodox saints